Alec Udell (born 1995) is an American racing driver from Houston, Texas. He has won the 2019 SRO GT4 European series Silver cup championship, the 2016 Pirelli World Challenge GT3 Cup championship and the 2013 Nasa Pro American Iron National Championship.

Racing career

Early career 
Alec grew up racing go-karts initially around Texas then moved into national competition, winning 4 national karting Championships. At the age of 15 he became the youngest driver, at the time, to race in the professional Pirelli World Challenge Racing series, racing a Chevrolet Camaro.

Pirelli World Challenge GTS 
From 2011 to 2014 Udell competed in the Pirelli World Challenge GTS category (now known as the SRO America GT4 series). In this series he competed in a Chevrolet Camaro (2011) with Momentum Autosports and a Ford Boss 302 (2012-2014) with Motorsports Development Group. In the 4 seasons of racing in the GTS category Alec garnered 4 podium finishes, 1 pole position and one fastest race lap.

Additional Appearances 
During this time Alec also competed in the NASA regional and national racing series. In 2012 he won the NASA Texas region championship in a Spec Miata. In 2013 Udell competed in the Nasa Pro American Iron class, winning the National Championship at Utah Motorsports Campus in a Boss 302. Additionally in 2013 Udell campaigned a Boss 302 in the Grand Am racing series at the Lime Rock round. In 2014 Udell had his first GT experience, testing the RISI Competizione Ferrari 458 Italia GTLM car and racing at the Circuit of the Americas round of the IMSA Tudor series in a Porsche 911 GT America car.

Pirelli World Challenge GT3 Cup 
In 2015, Alec stepped up into the new GT3 Cup category in Pirelli World Challenge driving with GMG in the No. 17 Euroworld Motorsports 991.1 Porsche GT3 Cup car. In 2015, his first season in the car, he took 3 wins, 13 podium finishes, and one pole position in 14 starts. 
The next year in 2016 Alec went back into the GT3 cup category again with GMG in the No. 17 Euroworld Motorsprots 991.1 Porsche GT3 Cup car. In 2016 Udell was dominant, winning 12 of 18 Races competed in, and finishing on the podium in every race of the GT3 Cup series that year.

Additional Appearances 
In 2015, Udell was selected as one of four Porsche Young Driver Academy participants at Barber Motorsports Park in Birmingham, AL. In 2016, he finished the Pirelli World Challenge season out competing in a Porsche GT3R in the final round of the Sprint-X series where he finished 6th. Alec also had a guest appearance at the Porsche Mobil 1 Supercup event at Circuit of the Americas where he finished 11th and 6th.

SRO GT World Challenge America 
2017 saw Alec jump into GT3 ranks competing in the No. 17 Euroworld Motorsports Porsche GT3R initially in GT-A within the SRO series, where he won both of the opening rounds at St. Petersburg. From there he was put into the Pro Category to compete against full factory efforts as a privateer, finding sponsorship and still a student in college. He had a career best overall Podium at Mid-Ohio finishing 3rd, behind Porsche Factory driver Patrick Long. 
Additionally in 2017 Udell competed in the SprintX Pro-Am category in the No. 77 Calvert Dynamics Porsche GT3R. 
In 2018 Udell Competed in 5 events in the No. 41 Loci Porsche GT3R, having a career best finish at VIRginia International Raceway, finishing 3rd in SprintX Pro-Pro.

SRO GT4 European Series 
In 2019, Alec made the jump to European Competition, competing in the SRO GT4 European Series in the No. 25 MDM Motorsport BMW M4. Udell competed in the Silver Cup class, winning 3 races, finishing 5 times on the podium and ultimately winning the Silver Championship in his first year of European Competition.

Racing record

Complete WeatherTech SportsCar Championship results
(key) (Races in bold indicate pole position; results in italics indicate fastest lap)

References 

Living people
1995 births
Racing drivers from Houston
Multimatic Motorsports drivers
Porsche Motorsports drivers
Michelin Pilot Challenge drivers
GT4 European Series drivers
WeatherTech SportsCar Championship drivers